Kotera, song by Greek-American rapper MadClip
Kotera is a South-Indian surname of unknown orgin
Kotera (written: 小寺 lit. "small temple") is a Japanese surname. Notable people with the surname include:
, Japanese footballer
, Japanese footballer

Japanese-language surnames